George Hickman (19 January 1909 – 26 August 1978) was an English cricketer.  Hickman was a right-handed batsman.  He was born in Burnopfield, County Durham.

Hickman made his first-class debut for Warwickshire against Derbyshire in the 1929 County Championship.  He made a further first-class appearance in 1929 against Kent.  These were his only major appearances for the county.  He later joined Durham, who he made his debut for in the 1933 Minor Counties Championship against Northumberland.  He played Minor counties cricket for Durham from 1933 to 1936, making 29 appearances.  While playing for Durham, he made two first-class appearances for the Minor Counties in 1935, playing against Cambridge University and Oxford University.

He died in Stranraer, Wigtownshire, Scotland on 26 August 1978.

References

External links
George Hickman at ESPNcricinfo
George Hickman at CricketArchive

1909 births
1978 deaths
People from Burnopfield
Cricketers from County Durham
English cricketers
Warwickshire cricketers
Durham cricketers
Minor Counties cricketers